Celebrity Come Dine With Me Australia is a celebrity version of the Australian television reality cooking series based on the Come Dine with Me format which premiered on 11 December 2012 on The LifeStyle Channel in Australia, as a spin-off to Come Dine with Me Australia. It is narrated by James Valentine.

Series Summary

History
In 2009, The Lifestyle Channel bought the rights to Come Dine with Me, commissioning Granada Media Australia to produce a version for the Australian market. The first season consists of 20 episodes. A second season was approved before the first season premiered and was broadcast in mid-2010. A fourth season was commissioned in 2012 with a celebrity Christmas special to screen prior to the fourth season. A second Christmas celebrity special was commissioned which aired in December 2013 along with a full celebrity season which aired in 2014.

Cancelled Revival

The series was set to be revived in 2016 by ITV Studios for the Nine Network. however on 14 April 2016, the series was shelved due to production issues and Nine implementing changes after a bad start to the ratings year.

Format
The unscripted show follows celebrity chefs competing against each other in hosting a dinner party for the other contestants. Each week over four nights, four celebrities take it in turns to cook up their idea of the perfect evening for the other four. Each believes they can cook up the perfect evening and hopes their unique style will clinch them the title of best host and the $2000 cash prize for charity.

Episodes

Xmas Special (2012)

Xmas Special (2013)

Season 1 (2014)

References

External links
Official website

See also
 MasterChef
 My Kitchen Rules
 Come Dine with Me Australia

2010s Australian reality television series
Australian cooking television series
Cooking competitions in Australia
Food reality television series
2012 Australian television series debuts
2014 Australian television series endings
English-language television shows
Television series by ITV Studios